Schwebel may refer to:
Milton Schwebel
Stephen M. Schwebel
Schwebel's Bakery